The Masked Gang is a 2005 Turkish comedy film directed by Murat Aslan. The film, which is about an incompetent gang of criminals attempting the biggest robbery of their careers, is based on Maskeli Beşler (1968) and was followed by The Masked Gang: Iraq (2007) and The Masked Gang: Cyprus (2008).

Synopsis
Five mischievous kids who grew up in an orphanage, but failed to be placed with any foster families because of their naughtiness, decide to form a gang as they are adults now. Their intentions are indisputable, but their skills aren't. However, when the child of very close friend is stricken with cancer and must be treated abroad, it becomes inevitable to plan the biggest robbery of their lives in spite of all their clumsiness.

Release

Reception
The movie reached number one at the Turkish box office and was one of the highest grossing Turkish film of 2005 with a total gross of $3,653,666.

References

External links
 Official website for the international distributor
 

2005 films
2000s Turkish-language films
2000s crime comedy films
Turkish crime comedy films
Films set in Turkey
2000s heist films
2005 comedy films